Stadion Rujevica (official name: Stadion HNK Rijeka) is a stadium in the city of Rijeka, Croatia. The stadium is commonly referred to as Rujevica after its location. From August 2015, the stadium is a temporary home ground for HNK Rijeka during construction of the new Stadion Kantrida. The stadium is part of the training camp used by the club's youth academy, which includes four additional fields. Once the new Kantrida is built, the stadium will be used as the club's training ground.

Construction
The construction of the training centre commenced on 15 September 2014 and was financed by the owners of HNK Rijeka. On 28 July 2015, the stadium was issued a licence from the Croatian football authorities. It was officially opened on 2 August 2015 with HNK Rijeka's 3–1 win against NK Lokomotiva. Marin Leovac scored the first goal.

Expansion
In January and November 2016, HNK Rijeka Chairman Damir Mišković hinted that the northern stand may be built in order to comply with UEFA stadium categories requirement for the group stages of the UEFA Champions League and UEFA Europa League to have a stadium with the minimum capacity of 8,000. The construction of the northern stand broke ground on 11 May 2017. The construction was completed on 21 July 2017, increasing the total capacity of the stadium from 6,039 to 8,279.

Capacity per sector
Four sectors contribute to the total seating capacity of 8,279:
Sector I (east): 2,852
Sector Z (west): 2,775 (including VIP sector)
Sector S (north): 2,240
Sector J (south): 412 (away supporters' sector)

League attendance
This is a list of HNK Rijeka’s league attendance at Rujevica by season.

International matches

References

Rujevica
Sports venues in Rijeka
stadium
Sports venues completed in 2015
Buildings and structures in Primorje-Gorski Kotar County
2015 establishments in Croatia